Satyrium ledereri, the orange banded hairstreak, is a butterfly in the family Lycaenidae.

Description in Seitz
T. ledereri Bsd. (73 e). Tailed or tailless, with long fringes and the anal angle of the hindwing somewhat pointed. Upperside blackish brown, the basal area glossy grey on both wings; in the anal area of the hindwing an obsolescent russet-brown macular halfband. Underside light grey, the base dusted with light blue; both wings with a row of exteriorly white-edged black ocelli, outside which there are black submarginal spots on the forewing and a double row of dots on the hindwing with red spots between the two rows. — In Asia Minor, Transcaucasia, Transcaspia and Armenia, in May.

Distribution
The distribution of the orange banded hairstreak in Europe includes Transcaucasia, Asia Minor, Anatolia, Palestine, and the Greek island of Samos.

Life cycle and food plants
The butterflies are on wing from April to May. Larval host plants are Atraphaxis daghestanica and A. spinosa. The species has one generation per year; the egg hibernates.

References

External links
Butterfly Conservation Armenia

Satyrium (butterfly)
Butterflies of Europe
Taxa named by Jean Baptiste Boisduval
Butterflies described in 1848